Iota Cancri (ι Cnc, ι Cancri) is a double star in the constellation Cancer approximately 300 light years from Earth.

The two stars of ι Cancri are separated by 30 arcseconds, changing only slowly.  Although no orbit has been derived, the two stars show a large common proper motion and are assumed to be gravitationally related.

The brighter star, ι Cancri A, is a yellow G-type giant with an apparent magnitude of +4.02.  It is a mild barium star, thought to be formed by mass transfer of enriched material from an asymptotic giant branch star onto a less evolved companion.  No such donor has been detected in the ι Cancri system, but it is assumed that there is an unseen white dwarf.

The fainter of the two stars, ι Cancri B, is a white A-type main sequence dwarf with an apparent magnitude of +6.57.  It is a shell star, surrounded by material expelled by its rapid rotation.

References

A-type main-sequence stars
G-type giants
Suspected variables
Shell stars
Barium stars
Binary stars
Cancri, Iota
Cancer (constellation)
Durchmusterung objects
Cancri, 48
074738 9
043100 3
3474 5